Bertalan Zakany (born 19 January 1984 in Miskolc, Hungary) is a Hungarian figure skater. He is the 2002 Hungarian national champion. His highest placement at an ISU Championship was 26th at the 2002 World Junior Figure Skating Championships. He has also competed at the European Figure Skating Championships and the World Figure Skating Championships. He currently plays Pinocchio in Pinocchio On Ice.

Results

External links
 
 Pinocchio On Ice Review

Hungarian male single skaters
1984 births
Living people
Sportspeople from Miskolc